United for Human Rights (UDH) was a political party in Venezuela. The party first contested national elections in 1998, when it won a single seat in the Chamber of Deputies. However, it lost its seat in the 2000 elections.

References

Defunct political parties in Venezuela